The Economic Community of the Great Lakes Countries (ECGLC) (in French CEPGL - Communauté Économique des Pays des Grand Lacs) is a sub-regional organization with multiple purposes created by the signing of the Agreement of Gisenyi in Rwanda on September 20, 1976, aiming at ensuring the safety of member states, favoring the creation and development of activities of public interest, promoting the trades and traffic of persons and possessions, and establishing close cooperation among all domains of political, economic, and social life.

It has three members: Burundi, the Democratic Republic of the Congo (formerly known as Zaire), and Rwanda. Its main purpose is to promote regional economic cooperation and integration.

The CEPGL controls the following institutions:
 Development Bank of the Great Lakes States (BDEGL)
 Economic Community of the Great Lakes Countries for Energy (EGL)
 Institute for Agricultural Research and Animal Husbandry (IRAZ)
 International Society for Electricity in the Great Lakes Region (SINELAC)

References

External links 
official website

Trade blocs